Scandalous Gilda is a 1985 Italian erotic drama film  written and directed by Gabriele Lavia and starring  Monica Guerritore and the same Lavia.

Plot

Cast 

Monica Guerritore as The Woman
Gabriele Lavia as The Man
Pina Cei as The Housekeeper
 Italo Gasperini 
 Dario Mazzoli 
 Jasmine Maimone

See also
 List of Italian films of 1985

References

External links

1980s erotic drama films
Films directed by Gabriele Lavia
Italian erotic drama films
1985 drama films
1985 films
1980s Italian-language films
1980s Italian films